The Hôtel Maurel de Pontevès (a.k.a. Hôtel d'Espagnet) is a listed hôtel particulier in Aix-en-Provence, Bouches-du-Rhône, France.

Location
The hotel is located at 38 on the Cours Mirabeau in the centre of Aix-en-Provence.

History
The hotel was one of the first hotels to be built in the Quartier Mazarin. Its construction started in 1647, and it was only completed four years later, in 1651. It was designed by architects Jean Lombard and Pierre Pavillon. They combined the architectural styles of mannerism and Baroque architecture.

The first owner was Pierre Maurel, a prosperous cloth merchant who purchased the marquisate of Pontevès.

Heritage significance
It has been listed as a "monument historique" since February 8, 1990.

References

Hôtels particuliers in Aix-en-Provence
Monuments historiques of Aix-en-Provence
Houses completed in 1651
1651 establishments in France